The Girls on the Beach is a 1965 American beach party comedy film directed by William N. Witney and written by Sam Locke. The film stars Noreen Corcoran, Martin West, Linda Marshall, Steven Rogers, Ahna Capri and Aron Kincaid. The film was released on May 12, 1965, by Paramount Pictures.

Plot
Members of a sorority house engage in a variety of fund-raising schemes, including a supposed concert by The Beatles. It features musical appearances by The Beach Boys (who perform "Girls on the Beach", "Lonely Sea" and "Little Honda"), Lesley Gore (who performs "Leave Me Alone", "It's Gotta Be You" and "I Don't Want to Be a Loser"), and The Crickets.

Cast

Noreen Corcoran as Selma
Martin West as Duke
Linda Marshall as Cynthia
Steven Rogers as Brian
Ahna Capri as Arlene 
Aron Kincaid as Wayne
Nancy Spry as Betty
Sheila Bromley as Mrs. Winters
Lana Wood as Bonnie
Mary Mitchel as Emily
Gail Gilmore as Georgia 
Peter Brooks as Stu Rankin
Lori Saunders as Patricia Johnson 
The Crickets as themselves
The Beach Boys as themselves
Lesley Gore as herself

Reception
The Los Angeles Times said it had "the same old formula."

See also
List of American films of 1965
The Girls on the Road, spin-off sequel

References

External links
 
 
 The Girls on the Beach Soundtrack review at Beach Party Movie Music

1965 films
1965 comedy films
1960s teen comedy films
American teen comedy films
Beach party films
Cultural depictions of the Beatles
Films about fraternities and sororities
Films produced by Gene Corman
Films set in California
Paramount Pictures films
Teensploitation
Films directed by William Witney
1960s English-language films
1960s American films